Hao Wang (20 May 1921 – 13 May 1995) was a Chinese-American logician, philosopher, mathematician, and commentator on Kurt Gödel.

Biography
Born in Jinan, Shandong, in the Republic of China (today in the People's Republic of China), Wang received his early education in China. He obtained a BSc degree in mathematics from the National Southwestern Associated University in 1943 and an M.A. in Philosophy from Tsinghua University in 1945, where his teachers included Feng Youlan and Jin Yuelin, after which he moved to the United States for further graduate studies. He studied logic under W.V. Quine at Harvard University, culminating in a Ph.D. in 1948. He was appointed to an assistant professorship at Harvard the same year.

During the early 1950s, Wang studied with Paul Bernays in Zürich. In 1956, he was appointed Reader in the Philosophy of Mathematics at the University of Oxford. In 1959, Wang wrote on an IBM 704 computer a program that in only 9 minutes mechanically proved several hundred mathematical logic theorems in Whitehead and Russell's Principia Mathematica. In 1961, he was appointed Gordon McKay Professor of Mathematical Logic and Applied Mathematics at Harvard. From 1967 until 1991, he headed the logic research group at Rockefeller University in New York City, where he was professor of logic.  In 1972, Wang joined in a group of Chinese American scientists led by Chih-Kung Jen as the first such delegation from the U.S. to the People's Republic of China.

One of Wang's most important contributions was the Wang tile. He showed that any Turing machine can be turned into a set of Wang tiles. The domino problem is to find an algorithm that uses a set of Wang tiles to tile the plane. The first noted example of aperiodic tiling is a set of Wang tiles, whose nonexistence Wang had once conjectured, discovered by his student Robert Berger in 1966. Wang also had a significant influence on theory of computational complexity.

A philosopher in his own right, Wang also developed a penetrating interpretation of Ludwig Wittgenstein's later philosophy of mathematics, which he called "anthropologism."  Later he broadened this reading in the foundations of mathematics.  He chronicled Kurt Gödel's philosophical ideas and authored several books on the subject, thereby providing contemporary scholars many insights elucidating Gödel's later philosophical thought. He saw his own philosophy of "substantial factualism" as a middle ground that includes both abstract theoretical formulations and the ordinary language of everyday discourse.  His interpretations of Gödel are taken to be authoritative.

In 1983 he was presented with the first Milestone Prize for Automated Theorem-Proving, sponsored by the International Joint Conference on Artificial Intelligence.

Books
Les Systèmes axiomatiques de la Théorie des Ensembles, Gauthier-Villars; Paris, 1953. [Wang 1953a, with Robert McNaughton].
A Survey of Mathematical Logic.  Peking:  Science Press; Amsterdam:  North-Holland, 1962. [Wang 1962a].
From Mathematics to Philosophy.  London:  Routledge & Kegan Paul, 1974.  [Wang 1974a].
Popular Lectures on Mathematical Logic.  New York:  Van Nostrand, 1981.  [Wang 1981a].  . Dover reprint 2014. 
Beyond Analytic Philosophy: Doing Justice to What We Know.  Cambridge, Massachusetts:  MIT Press, 1985.  [Wang 1985a].  .
Reflections on Kurt Gödel.  Cambridge, Massachusetts:  MIT Press, 1987.  [Wang 1987a].  .
Computation, Logic, Philosophy. A Collection of Essays.  Beijing:  Science Press; Dordrecht:  Kluwer Academic, 1990.  [Wang 1990a].  .
A Logical Journey: From Gödel to Philosophy.  Cambridge, Massachusetts:  MIT Press, 1996.  [Wang 1996a].  .

References

External links

Obituary from The New York Times.
Video interview with Hao Wang and Robin Gandy (and portrait of Wang)

Detailed bibliography
"A Bibliography of Hao Wang" from Philosophia Mathematica.  References in square brackets are to this source.

1921 births
1995 deaths
20th-century American mathematicians
Philosophers of mathematics
Chinese emigrants to the United States
Chinese logicians
American logicians
Harvard Graduate School of Arts and Sciences alumni
Harvard University faculty
Tsinghua University alumni
American writers of Chinese descent
Writers from Dezhou
Educators from Shandong
Scientists from Shandong
Philosophers from Shandong
Corresponding Fellows of the British Academy
National Southwestern Associated University alumni